The 2010 All-Big Ten Conference football team consists of American football players chosen as All-Big Ten Conference players for the 2010 Big Ten Conference football season.  The conference recognizes two official All-Big Ten selectors: (1) the Big Ten conference coaches selected separate offensive and defensive units and named first- and second-team players (the "Coaches" team); and (2) a panel of sports writers and broadcasters covering the Big Ten also selected offensive and defensive units and named first- and second-team players (the "Media" team).

Offensive selections

Quarterbacks
 Dan Persa, Northwestern (Coaches-1; Media-2)
 Denard Robinson, Michigan (Media-1)
 Scott Tolzien, Wisconsin (Coaches-2)

Running backs
 Mikel Leshoure, Illinois (Coaches-1; Media-1)
 Dan Herron, Ohio State (Coaches-1)
 Edwin Baker, Michigan State (Media-1)
 Evan Royster, Penn State (Coaches-2)
 John Clay, Wisconsin (Coaches-2; Media-2)
 James White, Wisconsin (Media-2)

Receivers
 Dane Sanzenbacher, Ohio State (Coaches-1; Media-1)
 Tandon Doss, Indiana (Coaches-1; Media-2)
 Derrell Johnson-Koulianos, Iowa (Coaches-1)
 Jeremy Ebert, Northwestern (Media-1)
 Marvin McNutt, Iowa (Coaches-2)
 Roy Roundtree, Michigan (Media-2)

Centers
 David Molk, Michigan (Coaches-1; Media-2)
 Mike Brewster, Ohio State (Coaches-2; Media-1)

Guards
 John Moffitt, Wisconsin (Coaches-1; Media-1)
 Stefen Wisniewski, Penn State (Coaches-1; Media-2)
 Justin Boren, Michigan (Coaches-2; Media-1)
 Julian Vandervelde, Iowa (Coaches-2; Media-2)

Tackles
 Mike Adams, Ohio State (Coaches-1; Media-1) 
 Gabe Carimi, Wisconsin (Coaches-1; Media-1)
 Riley Reiff, Iowa (Coaches-2; Media-2)
 D. J. Young, Michigan State (Coaches-2)
 Jeff Allen, Illinois (Media-2)

Tight ends
 Lance Kendricks, Wisconsin (Coaches-1; Media-1)
 Allen Reisner, Iowa (Coaches-2)
 Charlie Gantt, Michigan State (Media-2)

Defensive selections

Defensive linemen
 Adrian Clayborn, Iowa (Coaches-1; Media-1)
 Cameron Heyward, Ohio State (Coaches-1; Media-1)
 Ryan Kerrigan, Purdue (Coaches-1; Media-1)
 J. J. Watt, Wisconsin (Coaches-1; Media-1)
 Corey Liuget, Illinois (Coaches-2; Media-2)
 Karl Klug, Iowa (Coaches-2; Media-2)
 Mike Martin, Michigan (Coaches-2)
 Ollie Ogbu, Penn State (Coaches-2)
 Vince Browne, Northwestern (Media-2)
 Kawann Short, Purdue (Media-2)

Linebackers
 Greg Jones, Michigan State (Coaches-1; Media-1)
 Brian Rolle, Ohio State (Coaches-1; Media-1)
 Ross Homan, Ohio State (Coaches-1; Media-2)
 Martez Wilson, Illinois (Coaches-2; Media-1)
 Eric Gordon, Michigan State (Coaches-2; Media-2)
 Jeremiha Hunter, Iowa (Coaches-2)
 Jonas Mouton, Michigan (Media-2)

Defensive backs
 Chimdi Chekwa, Ohio State (Coaches-1; Media-1)
 Shaun Prater, Iowa (Coaches-1; Media-1)
 Tyler Sash, Iowa (Coaches-1; Media-1)
 Jermale Hines, Ohio State (Coaches-1; Media-2)
 Antonio Fenelus, Wisconsin (Media-1)
 Brett Greenwood, Iowa (Coaches-2)
 Johnny Adams, Michigan State (Coaches-2)
 Trenton Robinson, Michigan State (Coaches-2)
 Chris L. Rucker, Michigan State (Coaches-2)
 Aaron Henry, Wisconsin (Coaches-2)
 Marcus Hyde, Michigan State (Media-2)
 Brian Peters, Northwestern (Media-2)
 Ricardo Allen, Purdue (Media-2)

Special teams

Kickers
 Dan Conroy, Michigan State (Coaches-1; Media-1)
 Derek Dimke, Illinois (Coaches-2)
 Devin Barclay, Ohio State (Media-2)

Punter
 Anthony Santella, Illinois (Coaches-1; Media-2)
 Aaron Bates, Michigan State (Coaches-2; Media-1)

Key
Bold = Consensus first-team selection by both the coaches and media

Coaches = Selected by the Big Ten Conference coaches

Media = Selected by the conference media

See also
 2010 College Football All-America Team

References

All-Big Ten Conference
All-Big Ten Conference football teams